The mado (Atypichthys latus), in New Zealand, or stripy or eastern footballer ,in Australia, is a species of sea chub found in inshore waters around southern Australia and the north eastern coast of the North Island of New Zealand to depths of about , off headlands and offshore islands. This species can also be found in the aquarium trade.

References

 
 Tony Ayling & Geoffrey Cox, Collins Guide to the Sea Fishes of New Zealand,  (William Collins Publishers Ltd, Auckland, New Zealand 1982) 

Mado
Fish described in 1916